Castanea sativa, the sweet chestnut, Spanish chestnut or just chestnut, is a species of tree in the family Fagaceae, native to Southern Europe and Asia Minor, and widely cultivated throughout the temperate world. A substantial, long-lived deciduous tree, it produces an edible seed, the chestnut, which has been used in cooking since ancient times.

Description 
Around 20 trees are recorded with diameters over  including one  in diameter at breast height. The bark often has a net-shaped (retiform) pattern with deep furrows or fissures running spirally in both directions up the trunk. The trunk is mostly straight with branching starting at low heights.

In the Northern Hemisphere, they appear in late June to July, and by autumn, the female flowers develop into spiny cupules containing 3–7 brownish nuts that are shed during October. The female flowers eventually form a spiky sheath that deters predators from the seed. The sweet chestnut is naturally self incompatible, meaning that the plant cannot pollinate itself, making cross-pollination necessary. Some cultivars only produce one large seed per cupule, while others produce up to three seeds. The nut itself is composed of two skins: an external, shiny brown part, and an internal skin adhering to the fruit. Inside, there is an edible, creamy-white part developed from the cotyledons.

Sweet chestnut trees live to an age of 500 to 600 years. In cultivation they may even grow as old as 1,000 years or more.

Taxonomy 
The tree is to be distinguished from the horse chestnut Aesculus hippocastanum, to which it is only distantly related. The horse chestnut bears similar looking seeds (conkers) in a similar seed case, which are not palatable to humans. Other common names include "Spanish chestnut", or "marron" (French for "chestnut"). The generic name Castanea is the old Latin name for the plant species, while the specific epithet sativa means "cultivated by humans". Some selected varieties are smaller and more compact in growth yielding earlier in life with different ripening time: the Marigoule, the Marisol and the Maraval.

Distribution and habitat

The species is native to Southern Europe and Asia Minor. It is found across the Mediterranean region, from the Caspian Sea to the Atlantic Ocean. It is thought to have survived the last ice age in several refuges in Southern Europe, on the southern coast of the Black Sea with a main centre on the southern slope of the Caucasus and in the region of north-western Syria, possibly extending into Lebanon.

Italy, France, southern Switzerland, Spain, Portugal and Greece are countries with a strong sweet chestnut tradition, with trees cultivated intensively in coppices and orchards. Countries like England, Croatia, Turkey and Georgia only have a partially developed sweet chestnut tradition due to geography or history. Nevertheless, centuries-old specimens may be found in Great Britain today. Examples can be seen particularly in the London Boroughs of Islington and Camden. In other European countries, C. sativa has only been introduced recently, for example in Slovakia or the Netherlands.

The tree requires a mild climate and adequate moisture for good growth and a good nut harvest. Its year-growth (but not the rest of the tree) is sensitive to late spring and early autumn frosts; it is also intolerant of lime. Under forest conditions, it will tolerate moderate shade well. It can live to more than 2,000 years of age in natural conditions, such as the Hundred Horse Chestnut near Mount Etna in eastern Sicily.

Ecology 

The leaves provide food for some animals, including Lepidoptera such as the case-bearer moth Coleophora anatipennella and North American rose chafer Macrodactylus subspinosus.

The two major fungal pathogens of the sweet chestnut are the chestnut blight (Cryphonectria parasitica) and the ink disease caused by Phytophthora cambivora and Phytophthora cinnamomi. In North America as well as in Southern Europe Cryphonectria parasitica destroyed most of the chestnut population in the 20th century. With biological control, the population of the sweet chestnut is not threatened anymore by the chestnut blight and is regenerating. Ink disease is infesting trees mostly in humid soils, with the mycelium invading the root and resulting in wilting of the leaf. Absence of fruit formation leads to die back of the petal. The ink disease is named after the black exudates at the base of the trunk. Nowadays there are cultivars that are resistant to the ink disease. Phytophthora cambivora caused serious damage in Asia and the US, and it still continues to destroy new plantations in Europe.

Another serious pest which is difficult to control is the gall wasp (Dryocosmus kuriphylus) which was recently introduced in Southern Europe, originating in Asia.

Cultivation

Cultivation forms 
Three different cultivation systems for the sweet chestnut can be distinguished:

 Coppicing: Mainly for wood extraction. Standard conditions yield 15 m3 wood per ha and year.
 Selve: Fruit production from grafted trees. The trees have a short tribe and a big crown. Trees have a high density and the ground between the trees is often used as pasture.
 High forest: Wood and fruit production. This cultivation form is less intensive with a yield of 4–12 dt/ha and replacement of trees every 50–80 years. The trees grow from seeds and build a dense canopy.

The field management is dependent on the cultivation system. While cleaning the soil from the leaves and pruning is the norm, the use of fertilizer, irrigation and pesticides is less common and reserved for more intensive cultivation.

Requirements 
The sweet chestnut tree grows well on limestone-free, deeply weathered soil. The optimal pH value of the soil is between 4.5 and 6, and the tree cannot tolerate soil compaction. The tolerance to wet ground and to clay-rich soils is very low. It is a heat-loving tree which needs a long vegetation period. The optimal average temperature is between 8 °C and 15 °C and in January the temperature should preferably not be below -1 °C but it may tolerate temperatures as low as -15 °C. Low temperature in autumn can damage the fruit. The maximal altitude is strongly dependent on the climate. In general, the climate should be similar to viticulture. Before planting, seeds must be stratified at 2-3 °C so germination can start 30–40 days later. After a year, the young trees are being transplanted.

Harvest 
A tree grown from seed may take 20 years or more before it bears fruits, but a grafted cultivar such as 'Marron de Lyon' or 'Paragon' may start production within five years of being planted. Both cultivars bear fruits with a single large kernel, rather than the usual two to four smaller kernels.

Harvest time is between middle of September and middle of November. There are three harvesting techniques:

 By hand: The sweet chestnuts are harvested by rake or broom, with a harvest speed of 5 to 30 kg every hour depending on the soil relief. Also, the capsule makes the harvest more complicated and even painful for the worker.
 By hand with nets: This technique is less time-consuming and protects the fruits from injuries. However, setting up the nets is work intensive.
 Mechanical: The fruits are collected with a machine that works similarly to a vacuum cleaner. Doing so is time-saving and economical, but it's possible that some fruits get injured, and a big initial investment is needed. Furthermore, a visual sorting is not possible.

The total world chestnut harvest was 1.17 million tons in 2006, but only 151,000 tons were C. sativa.

Post-harvest treatment 
The most widespread treatment before storage is water curing, a process in which the sweet chestnuts are immersed in water for nine days. The aim of this practice is to limit the main storage problems threatening the sweet chestnut: fungi development and the presence of insect worms. As an alternative to water curing, hot water treatment is also commercially used.

After water treatment, the sweet chestnuts are stored in a controlled environment with high carbon dioxide concentrations. In contrast to a cold storage system, where the fruits are stored at low temperatures in untreated air, the controlled environment method avoids flesh hardening which negatively impacts the processability of the product.

Cultivars 
The ornamental cultivar C. sativa 'Albomarginata' has gained the Royal Horticultural Society's Award of Garden Merit.

French origin 

 Bouche de Betizac
 Maraval
 Marigoule
 Marsol
 Precoce Migoule

American origin 

 Colossal
 Labor Day

Uses 

The species is widely cultivated for its edible seeds (also called nuts) and for its wood.

Sweet chestnut has been listed as one of the 38 substances used to prepare Bach flower remedies, a kind of alternative medicine promoted for its supposed effect on health. However, according to Cancer Research UK, "there is no scientific evidence to prove that flower remedies can control, cure or prevent any type of disease, including cancer".

Food 

The species' large genetic diversity and different cultivars are exploited for uses such as flour, boiling, roasting, drying, and sweets.

The raw nuts, though edible, have a skin which is astringent and unpleasant to eat when still moist; after drying for a time the thin skin loses its astringency but is still better removed to reach the white fruit underneath. Cooking dry in an oven or fire normally helps remove this skin. Chestnuts are traditionally roasted in their tough brown husks after removing the spiny cupules in which they grow on the tree, the husks being peeled off and discarded and the hot chestnuts dipped in salt before eating them. Roast chestnuts are traditionally sold in streets, markets and fairs by street vendors with mobile or static braziers.

The skin of raw peeled chestnuts can be relatively easily removed by quickly blanching the nuts after scoring them by a cross slit at the tufted end. Once cooked, chestnuts acquire a sweet flavour and a floury texture similar to the sweet potato. The cooked nuts can be used for stuffing poultry, as a vegetable or in nut roasts. They can also be used in confections, puddings, desserts and cakes. They are used for flour, bread making, a cereal substitute, coffee substitute, a thickener in soups and other cookery uses, as well as for fattening stock. A sugar can be extracted from them. The Corsican variety of polenta (called pulenta) is made with sweet chestnut flour. A local variety of Corsican beer also uses chestnuts. The product is sold as a sweetened paste mixed with vanilla, sweetened or unsweetened as chestnut purée or purée de marron, and candied chestnuts as marrons glacés.
In Switzerland, it is often served as Vermicelles.

Roman soldiers were given chestnut porridge before going into battle.

Leaf infusions are used in respiratory diseases and are a popular remedy for whooping cough. A hair shampoo can be made from infusing leaves and fruit husks.

Constituents 
Castanea sativa is considered as having very interesting nutritional characteristics. The fruit contains significant amounts of a wide range of valuable nutrients. In the past, its characteristic and nutritional components gave sweet chestnut an important role in human nutrition due to its beneficial health effects. Sweet chestnut is also appreciated in a gluten-free diet. Furthermore, this characteristic is valuable in cases of celiac diseases as well as reducing coronary heart diseases and cancer rates. Various composition and health studies have shown its big potential as a food ingredient and functional food. The fat content is very low and is dominated for the most part by unsaturated fatty acids. Sweet chestnut is a good source for starch; chestnuts of all varieties generally contain about the same amount of starch. The energy value per 100 g (3.5 oz) of C. sativa amounts to 891 kJ (213 kcal). C. sativa is characterized by high moisture content which ranges from 41% to 59% and a considerable level of starch (≈40 g 100 g−1 dry matter). Regarding mineral content, the chestnut provides a good source for copper, iron, magnesium, manganese and potassium. Its sugar content ranges from 14% to 20% dry weight depending on the cultivar; which is very important, since the sensory appeal of sweet chestnut is correlated with its sugar content. However, high sugar amounts seem to have a negative impact on the fiber content. Generally, glucose content in European chestnuts is very low and ranges from zero to traces. Instead, fructose is mostly responsible for the sweet taste.

Effect of processing 
Sweet chestnut is suited for human nutrition. Most sweet chestnut is consumed in processed form, which has an impact on the nutrient composition. Its naturally high concentration of organic acids is a key factor influencing the organoleptic characteristics of fruits and vegetables, namely flavor. Organic acids are thought to play an important role against diseases as an antioxidant. Heat appears to be the most influencing factor when it comes to decreasing the organic acid content. However, even after heating sweet chestnuts, antioxidant activity remains relatively high. On the other hand, the consumer must consider that roasting, boiling or frying has a big impact on the nutritional profile of chestnut. Vitamin C significantly decreases between 25 and 54% when boiled and 2–77 % when roasted. Nevertheless, roasted or boiled chestnuts may still be a solid vitamin C source, since 100 gram still represent about 20% of the recommended daily dietary intake. The sugar content is also affected by the high temperatures. Four processes are decisive for the degrading process of sugar while cooking: hydrolysis of starch to oligosaccharide and monosaccharide, decomposition of sucrose to glucose and fructose, caramelization of sugars and degradation of sugars. Organic acids are also affected by high temperatures: their content decreases about 50% after frying, and 15% after boiling. Responsible for the aromatic characteristics of cooked chestnuts is the effect of degradation of saccharides, proteins and lipids, the caramelization of saccharides and the maillard reaction that is reducing sugar and amino acids.

Wood 

This tree responds very well to coppicing, which is still practised in Britain, and produces a good crop of tannin-rich wood every 12 to 30 years, depending on intended use and local growth rate. The tannin renders the young growing wood durable and weather resistant for outdoor use, thus suitable for posts, fencing or stakes. The wood is of light colour, hard and strong. It is used to make furniture, barrels (sometimes used to age balsamic vinegar), and roof beams notably in southern Europe (for example in houses of the Alpujarra, Spain, in southern France and elsewhere).  The timber has a density of 560 kg per cubic meter, and due to its durability in ground contact is often used for external purposes such as fencing. It is also a good fuel, though not favoured for open fires as it tends to spit.

Tannin is found in the following proportions on a 10% moisture basis: bark (6.8%), wood (13.4%), seed husks (10 - 13%). The leaves also contain tannin.

History 

Pollen data indicates that the first spreading of C. sativa due to human activity started around 2100–2050 B.C. in Anatolia, northeastern Greece and southeastern Bulgaria. Compared to other crops, the sweet chestnut was probably of relatively minor importance and distributed very heterogeneously throughout these regions. The first charcoal remains of sweet chestnut only date from around 850–950 B.C., making it very difficult to infer a precise origin history. A newer but more reliable source are the literary works of Ancient Greece, with the richest being Theophrastus's Historia plantarum, written in the third century B.C. Theophrastus focuses mainly on the use of sweet chestnut wood as timber and charcoal, only mentioning the use of the fruit once when commenting on the digestive difficulties it causes, but praising its nourishing quality. Several Greek authors wrote about medicinal properties of the sweet chestnut, specifically as a remedy against lacerations of the lips and of the oesophagus.

Similar to the introduction of grape vine and olive cultivation to the Latin world, C. sativa is thought to have been introduced during the colonisation of the Italian peninsula by the Greeks. Further clues pointing to this theory can be found in the work of Pliny the Elder, who mentions only Greek colonies in connection with sweet chestnut cultivation. Today's phylogenetic map of the sweet chestnut, while not fully understood, shows greater genetic similarity between Italian and western Anatolian C. sativa trees compared to eastern Anatolian specimen, reinforcing these findings. Nonetheless, until the end of the pre-Christian era, the spread and use of the chestnut in Italy remained limited. Carbonised sweet chestnuts were found in a Roman villa at Torre Annunziata near Naples, destroyed by the eruption of Mount Vesuvius in A.D. 79.

Clues in art and literature indicate a dislike of the sweet chestnut by the Roman aristocracy. Like Theophrastus, Latin authors are sceptical of the sweet chestnut as a fruit, and Pliny the Elder even goes as far as admiring how well nature has hidden this fruit of apparently so little value. In the beginning of the Christian era, people probably started to realize the value and versatility of sweet chestnut wood, leading to a slow spread of the cultivation of C. sativa trees, a theory that is supported by pollen data and literary sources, as well as the increased use of sweet chestnut wood as poles and in supporting structures, wood works and pier building between A.D. 100 and 600.

Increasing sweet chestnut pollen appearances in Switzerland, France, Germany and the Iberian peninsula in the first century A.D. suggests the spreading of cultivated sweet chestnut trees by the Romans. Contrary to that notion, other scientists found no indication of the Romans spreading C. sativa before the fifth century. While the husks of sweet chestnuts, dated to the third or early fourth century, have been identified from the bottom of a Roman well at Great Holts Farm, in Boreham in Essex, England; this deposit includes remains of other exotic food plants and provides no evidence that any of them originated locally. No other evidence of sweet chestnut in Roman Britain has been confirmed.  Indeed, no centre of sweet chestnut cultivation outside the Italian peninsula in Roman times has been detected. Widespread use of chestnut in western Europe started in the early Middle Ages and flourished in the late Middle Ages. In the mid-seventh-century Lombard laws, a composition of one solidi is set for felling a chestnut tree (or, also, hazel, pear or apple) belonging to another person (Edictum Rothari, No. 301, 643 AD). Since the beginning of the 20th century, due to depopulation of the countryside and the abandonment of the sweet chestnut as a staple food as well as the spread of chestnut blight and ink disease, C. sativa cultivation has dramatically decreased. Nowadays, sweet chestnut production is sometimes seen at a turning point again, because the development of high-value sweet chestnut products combined with changing needs of an urban society is leading to a revival in C. sativa cultivation.

See also 

 American chestnut
 Chinese chestnut
 Japanese chestnut

References 

 Rushforth, K. (1999). Trees of Britain and Europe. HarperCollins .
 Fao.org Castanea sativa

External links 

 U.C. Davis, California: Castanea sativa in horticulture
 Plants for a Future database: Castanea sativa
 Castanea sativa - distribution map, genetic conservation units and related resources. European Forest Genetic Resources Programme (EUFORGEN)

sativa
Edible nuts and seeds
Flora of Western Asia
Flora of Europe
Flora of Greece
Flora of Italy
Medicinal plants of Asia
Medicinal plants of Europe
Trees of Mediterranean climate
Garden plants of Asia
Garden plants of Europe
Ornamental trees
Flora of Montenegro
Fruit trees
Taxa named by Philip Miller